Krzysztof Pierwieniecki (born 7 April 1952) is a Polish boxer. He competed in the men's light welterweight event at the 1972 Summer Olympics.

References

1952 births
Living people
Polish male boxers
Olympic boxers of Poland
Boxers at the 1972 Summer Olympics
People from Szczecinek County
Sportspeople from West Pomeranian Voivodeship
Light-welterweight boxers